The Yucatan flagfish (Garmanella pulchra), also known as the snakeskin killifish, is a species of pupfish from the family Cyprinodontidae. It is found in the coastal waters (both fresh and brackish) of the Yucatan Peninsula, in Mexico and Belize. This species grows to a length of  TL and is found in the aquarium trade. It is the only known member of its genus. The name of the genus commemorates the American ichthyologist Samuel Garman (1843-1927) who was working on a revision of his 1895 monograph on the Cyprinodontidae at the time of his death. It is sometimes treated as a junior synonym of Jordanella.

The Yucatan flagfish is found in coastal brackish water systems and inland freshwaters with hard water over substrates of marl, sand, decomposing vegetation, rocks and mud. It is mainly herbivorous, its diet largely being made up of microalgae, but it also eats small invertebrates such as ostracods, tanaidacea, and amphipods.

References

Cyprinodontidae
Monotypic fish genera
Taxa named by Carl Leavitt Hubbs
Fish described in 1936
Taxobox binomials not recognized by IUCN